André Filipe Fernandes Nogueira (born 10 February 1987) is a Portuguese professional footballer who plays as a right back.

Club career
Born in Anadia, Aveiro District, Nogueira played youth football with local Anadia F.C. and Sporting CP. He was loaned by the latter club to S.C. Esmoriz to kickstart his senior career in 2006 in the third division, and remained in that level seven consecutive seasons, also representing S.C.U. Torreense, Atlético Clube de Portugal and Anadia.

Nogueira reached the professionals in summer 2013 at the age of 26, signing with S.C. Beira-Mar. He made his debut in the Segunda Liga on 12 August of that year when he played the full 90 minutes in a 2–3 home loss against FC Porto B, and finished the campaign with 27 games to help his team to the 12th position.

On 21 June 2014, Nogueira extended his contract with the Aveiro side for another two years. He left after only one, however, and returned to the lower leagues and Anadia.

Nogueira competed in amateur football until his retirement, representing Beira-Mar, SC São João de Ver and F.C. Pampilhosa.

References

External links

Aveiro Football Association profile 

1987 births
Living people
People from Anadia, Portugal
Portuguese footballers
Association football defenders
Liga Portugal 2 players
Segunda Divisão players
Anadia F.C. players
Sporting CP footballers
S.C.U. Torreense players
Atlético Clube de Portugal players
R.D. Águeda players
S.C. Beira-Mar players
SC São João de Ver players
FC Pampilhosa players
Portugal youth international footballers
Sportspeople from Aveiro District